Peter Seier Christensen (born 30 December 1967 in Viborg) is a Danish politician, chemical engineer and inventor, who is a member of the Folketing for The New Right political party. He was elected into the Folketing in the 2019 Danish general election.

Education and Career
Christensen studied chemical engineering at the Technical University of Denmark from 1986 to 1992, gaining masters and PhD.
He was employed as an engineer by Haldor Topsøe from 1994 to 2019.  While there he was the author of patents on reforming hydrocarbons, preparation of synthesis gas, particularly by steam reforming, and the use of catalyst lined equipment.

Political career
Christensen first ran for parliament in the 2019 election, where he received 1,850 votes. This was enough for one of The New Right's levelling seats. Since 2020 Peter Seier has been the group leader of the party's parliamentary group. At the 2022 general election he was re-elected a member of the Folketing with 2,806 votes.

External links 
 Biography on the website of the Danish Parliament (Folketinget)

References 

Living people
1967 births
People from Viborg Municipality
The New Right (Denmark) politicians
Members of the Folketing 2019–2022
Danish inventors
Danish chemical engineers
Members of the Folketing 2022–2026